Mucilaginibacter gotjawali is a Gram-negative and non-motile bacterium from the genus of Mucilaginibacter which has been isolated from soil from the Gotjawal forest on Jejudo on Korea.

References

External links
Type strain of Mucilaginibacter gotjawali at BacDive -  the Bacterial Diversity Metadatabase	

Sphingobacteriia
Bacteria described in 2015